In Shafer’s dichromatic reflection model, scene radiance has two components:

 

 λ is the wavelength,
 cb is the body (diffuse) reflected component,
 cs is the surface (interface) (specular) reflected component,
 mb and ms are scale factors depending on illumination, view directions and surface orientation.

Separation algorithm

BREN (body reflection essence-neuter) model based 

Body essence is an entity invariant to interface reflection, and has two degrees of freedom. The Gaussian coefficient generalizes a conventional simple thresholding scheme, and it provides detailed use of body color similarity.

References

Applied mathematics
Optics